Pseudoparentia is a genus of flies in the family Dolichopodidae. It is known from Australia.

Species
 Pseudoparentia advena Bickel, 1994
 Pseudoparentia canalicula Bickel, 2013
 Pseudoparentia centralis Bickel, 1994
 Pseudoparentia hangayi Bickel, 1994
 Pseudoparentia niharae Bickel, 2013
 Pseudoparentia nullaborensis Bickel, 1994
 Pseudoparentia tricosa Bickel, 1994

References

Sciapodinae
Dolichopodidae genera
Diptera of Australasia
Insects of Australia